Terme is a district of Samsun Province of Turkey.

Terme District is the site of an annual festival celebrating the Amazons, an ancient nation of all-female warriors who are believed to have lived in the Samsun region.

See also
 Terme
 Terme River

References

Populated places in Samsun Province
Districts of Samsun Province